The Motisi Mafia clan is a historical Sicilian Mafia clan from the Pagliarelli area in Palermo. The Motisi clan is one of the oldest Mafia clans in Palermo, and a Motisi was mentioned in 1937 as the Mafia boss of Pagliarelli by Melchiorre Allegra, a mafioso physician who became an informant when he was arrested. Prior to that, Motisi had also been mentioned in the Sangiorgi report.

Historical leaderships 

 Lorenzo Motisi sat on the first Sicilian Mafia Commission for the Pagliarelli mandamento (Palermo).
 Ignazio Motisi sat on the Sicilian Mafia Commission at the end of the 1970s for the Pagliarelli mandamento (Palermo).
 Matteo Motisi (Palermo, April 16, 1918 – September 5, 2003) became a member of the Commission in 1983, as a result of the re-organization after the Second Mafia War. Previously, the Pagliarelli family had been part of the mandamento of Santa Maria di Gesù headed by Stefano Bontade. Matteo Motisi was an ally of the Corleonesi and received life sentences for the murders of anti-mafia judges Rocco Chinnici, Giovanni Falcone and Paolo Borsellino as well as for 22 murders of members of the Bontade and Inzerillo clans during the Second Mafia War in 1981-83.
 Giovanni Motisi (Palermo, January 1, 1959) succeeded his uncle Matteo Motisi as boss of the Pagliarelli family. He is a fugitive since 1993 and is considered to be one of the more powerful bosses of Palermo. He is considered to be close to Bernardo Provenzano. Motisi is on the "Most wanted list" of the Italian ministry of the Interior since 1998.

References

External links
 Most wanted list of the Italian ministry of the Interior Giovanni Motisi

 
1936 establishments in Italy